Haynes is a suburb of Perth, Western Australia, located within the City of Armadale. This rural and semi-rural suburb is located on the city's fringe, and in the 2010s began to be subdivided for urban purposes.

The suburb was named after Walter Alexander Birrell Haynes and his wife Margaret, who moved to the district sometime before 1910 and operated a dairy farm in the area for many years. Members of the Haynes family have made a significant contribution to local community organisations such as sporting clubs for many years, and helped establish many other groups. Walter Haynes was the Chairman of the Armadale-Kelmscott Road Board between 1938 and 1946.

The locality was formed from Brookdale on 1 April 2008.

The Haynes Shopping Centre is named for the suburb but is located in the adjacent locality of Armadale.

The closest train station is Armadale for public transport.

References

External links

Suburbs of Perth, Western Australia
Suburbs in the City of Armadale